Eleanor Allen Moore (26 July 1885 – 17 September 1955) was a British painter who was born in Northern Ireland, but became one of the group of painters known as the "Glasgow Girls".

Early life and education

Moore was born in Glenfield, Glenwherry, Co. Antrim in 1885. In 1888 she moved with her family to Ayrshire, Scotland, where her father worked as a minister at Loudoun Old Parish Church. She attended Kilmarnock Academy. From 1902 to 1907 she studied drawing and painting at the Glasgow School of Art, where she was a contemporary of Norah Neilson Gray.

World War I and later

During World War I Moore served as a Voluntary Aid Detachment nurse at Craigleith Hospital in Edinburgh.
In 1922, Moore married Dr Robert Cecil Robertson and she gave birth to their daughter, Ailsa, the following year. In 1925, the family moved to Shanghai, China, where Robertson was appointed with the Shanghai Municipal Council. Moore continued to paint in Shanghai, where she was inspired by the street scenes and by the Yangtze River Delta. Moore and her daughter were evacuated from Shanghai to Hong Kong during the Sino-Japanese War in 1937, and returned to Scotland soon after, though she had stopped painting. Her husband, Dr Robertson, remained in Hong Kong until his death in 1942.

Death and legacy
Moore died in a hospital in Edinburgh in 1955. Moore and her husband were the subject of an exhibition in 1997 which was held at the Dick Institute, Kilmarnock, which holds several of her works including a large three quarter length self-portrait. Moore was included in the Glasgow Girls exhibition in Kirkcudbright in 2010 and a book on the Glasgow Girls by Alisa Tanner, Tanner is Moore's daughter.

References

External links

1885 births
1955 deaths
20th-century British painters
20th-century British women artists
Alumni of the Glasgow School of Art
Female wartime nurses
Glasgow School
People educated at Kilmarnock Academy
People from County Antrim